This is a list of universities in Bolivia.

Public and CEUB approved universities
Escuela Militar de Ingeniería (La Paz)
Universidad Andina Simón Bolívar (Sucre)
Universidad Autónoma Gabriel René Moreno (Santa Cruz)
Universidad Autónoma Juan Misael Saracho (Tarija)
Universidad Autónoma Tomás Frías (Potosí)
Universidad Católica Boliviana (Cochabamba)
Universidad Católica Boliviana (La Paz)
Universidad Católica Boliviana (Santa Cruz)
Universidad Católica Boliviana (Tarija)
Universidad Mayor de San Andres (La Paz)
Universidad Mayor de San Simón (Cochabamba)
Universidad Técnica de Oruro (Oruro)
Universidad Mayor Real y Pontificia San Francisco Xavier (Sucre)

Private universities
Bolivian Private University (La Paz and Cochabamba)
Nur University (Bolivia)
TECH Technological University
Universidad Adventista de Bolivia (Cochabamba)
Universidad de Aquino Bolivia
 Universidad Loyola
Universidad Nuestra Señora de La Paz
Universidad Privada de Santa Cruz de la Sierra (Santa Cruz de la Sierra)

See also 
 List of colleges and universities
 List of colleges and universities by country

External links 
 Universities in Bolivia by region

Universities
Universities and colleges
Bolivia

Bolivia